Anything Else is a 2003 American romantic comedy film written and directed by Woody Allen, produced by Letty Aronson, and starring Jason Biggs, Christina Ricci, Allen, Stockard Channing, Danny DeVito, Jimmy Fallon, Erica Leerhsen and KaDee Strickland. The film was shown as the opening night selection at the 60th annual Venice International Film Festival. The film was released theatrically on September 19, 2003, to mixed reviews and commercial failure.

Plot
Jerry Falk (Biggs), an aspiring writer living in New York City, has a girlfriend, Brooke (Strickland). He falls in love with Amanda (Ricci) and has an affair with her. Brooke learns of Jerry's infidelity and leaves him. Amanda leaves her own boyfriend for Jerry. Jerry turns to aging, struggling artist David Dobel (Allen, loosely based on David Panich) who acts as his mentor, which includes trying to help sort out Jerry's romantic life. Dobel says that when he told a cab driver of all his anxieties and phobias in life, the cab driver told him, "It's like anything else".

Dobel tries to convince Jerry that his manager is only holding him back and his relationship with Amanda is the most destructive force in his life. Amanda continuously cheats on Jerry. Amanda leaves and then comes back. Jerry's neuroses start to worsen. Eventually, Jerry leaves town as Dobel gets him a job writing for television in California. Amanda has an affair with the doctor who was treating her and runs off with him. He sees them together laughing as she once did with him as the cab is taking him towards the airport. Jerry talks to the cabbie of love and relationships. The cabbie simply replies, "It's like anything else".

Cast

Reception
On Rotten Tomatoes the film has an approval rating of 40%, based on reviews from 137 critics. The site's consensus states: "Too many elements from better Woody Allen films are being recycled here." On Metacritic the film has an average score of 43 out of 100, based on reviews from 37 critics. Audiences surveyed by CinemaScore gave the film a grade C− on scale of A to F.

Roger Ebert of the Chicago Sun-Times gave the film 3 out of 4 and wrote: "At a time when so many American movies keep dialogue at a minimum so they can play better overseas, what a delight to listen to smart people whose conversation is like a kind of comic music."
James Berardinelli of ReelViews wrote: "Anything Else may not be the second coming of "Annie Hall," but it has more wit and substance than almost every post-college romance that sees the inside of a projection booth.
David Stratton of Variety magazine wrote: "The younger casting brings a freshness to the material and, with Allen as the weird mentor, there are plenty of laughs, even if the pacing's slow and the running time over-extended."

Mike Clark of USA Today was critical of the characterizations, the music, the length ("brutally overlong"), but praised the actors for their performances: "It's asking a lot of audiences to spend nearly two hours with characters as screen-unfriendly as the ones played by Biggs and Ricci, though both actors (and especially Ricci) do what they're asked to do." Clark also says the film "sounds as if it ought to be funny, but like so much else here, intent and execution keep missing each other." and complains that the misery of the story is not tempered by sufficient laughs.

In August 2009, it was cited by Quentin Tarantino as one of his favorite 20 films since 1992, when his career as a filmmaker began.

Leonard Maltin, in his movie and video guide, gave the film a "BOMB" rating (the only Allen-directed film he ever rated BOMB), and called it "Allen's all-time worst".
In 2016, film critics Robbie Collin and Tim Robey ranked Anything Else as one of the worst movies by Woody Allen.

Soundtrack

Easy to Love - Written by Cole Porter - Performed by Billie Holiday with Teddy Wilson & his Orchestra
Gat I - Written and performed by Ravi Shankar
It Could Happen to You - Written by Johnny Burke & Jimmy Van Heusen - Performed by Diana Krall
Gone with the Wind - Written by Herb Magidson & Allie Wrubel - Performed by Wes Montgomery
The Way You Look Tonight - Written by Dorothy Fields & Jerome Kern - Performed by Billie Holiday with Teddy Wilson & his Orchestra
I Can't Believe That You're in Love with Me - Written by Clarence Gaskill & Jimmy McHugh - Performed by Billie Holiday with Teddy Wilson & his Orchestra
Honeysuckle Rose - Written by Andy Razaf & Fats Waller - Performed by Teddy Wilson
I Can't Get Started - Written by Vernon Duke & Ira Gershwin - Performed by Lester Young
Sunday (The Day Before My Birthday) - Written by Moby & Sylvia Robinson - Performed by Moby
There'll Be Another Spring - Written by Peggy Lee & Hubie Wheeler - Performed by Stockard Channing
There Will Never Be Another You - Written by Harry Warren & Mack Gordon - Performed by Lester Young

References

External links
 
 
 

2003 films
Films directed by Woody Allen
Films about writers
Films set in New York City
Films shot in New York City
2003 romantic comedy films
DreamWorks Pictures films
American romantic comedy films
2000s English-language films
Films with screenplays by Woody Allen
Films produced by Letty Aronson
2000s American films